Victory Boogie Woogie is the last, unfinished work of the Dutch abstract painter Piet Mondrian, left incomplete when Mondrian died in New York in 1944. He was still working on it three days before dying. Since 1998 it has been in the collection of the Kunstmuseum, in The Hague. It has been said that "Mondrian's life and his affection for music are mirrored in the painting [and that it is] a testimony of the influence which New York had on Mondrian."

Purchase for Kunstmuseum, The Hague
It was purchased at a cost of 80 million Dutch guilders (approximately 35 million euros, US$40 million) from the American collector Samuel Irving Newhouse, who previously had bought it the from Emily and Burton Tremaine for US$12 million in the mid 1980s. It was bought in 1997 by the Stichting Nationaal Fonds Kunstbezit (National Art Foundation) through a gift from the Dutch Central Bank, commemorating the introduction of the euro, at the time the most expensive purchase ever for a Dutch museum. The amount of money raised questions in the Dutch House of Representatives, and also from other museums.

In 2014, U.S. President Barack Obama was photographed with Victory Boogie Woogie, in the company of some Dutch politicians.

References

External links
An Explanation of Victory Boogie Woogie by Artist Michael Sciam
Discussion over copyright of the painting New York Times (2014)

De Stijl
1944 paintings
Paintings by Piet Mondrian
Unfinished paintings
Collections of the Kunstmuseum, The Hague